The Soviet Union's 1957 nuclear test series was a group of 16 nuclear tests conducted in 1957. These tests followed the 1956 Soviet nuclear tests series and preceded the 1958 Soviet nuclear tests series.

References

1957
1957 in the Soviet Union
1957 in military history
Explosions in 1957